
This list of universities in Norway presents the country's universities, giving their locations, abbreviated titles (in Norwegian), and years of establishment. Most universities in Norway are state universities.

Denmark-Norway only had one university, the University of Copenhagen. In 1811 the Royal Frederick's University (now the University of Oslo) was established, based on the traditions and curriculum of the University of Copenhagen and effectively as a Norwegian successor institution. It remains the country's highest ranked university, and was Norway's only university until 1946. In the postwar era the University of Bergen, the University of Trondheim (now NTNU) and the University of Tromsø were founded. These universities are known as the "old universities".

Norway also has a number of university colleges, that are traditionally focused on vocational programs such as nursing or teacher education. Several of these colleges have received university status in recent years, and are referred to as "new universities," in contrast to the "old universities."

Most of the university colleges were created in 1994, following the university college reform. The University of Tromsø is the world's northernmost. Schools with an asterisk (*) have been created as the result of a merger.

Private university colleges with accredited programs 
 Ansgar School of Theology and Mission (Kristiansand) 
 Arkivakademiet (Oslo)
 Atlantis medisinske høgskole (Oslo)
 Baptistenes Teologiske Seminar (Stabekk)
 Barratt Due Institute of Music (Oslo)
 Bergen Deaconess University College (Bergen) 
 Bergen School of Architecture (Bergen) 
 Betanien Deaconal University College (Bergen)
 Bjørknes College (Oslo)
 Campus Kristiania (Oslo)
 Den norske balletthøyskole (Oslo)
 Noroff University College (Kristiansand)
 Norwegian Eurythmy College (Oslo)
 Norwegian University College for Agriculture and Rural Development (Klepp)

See also 
 Open access in Norway

Notes

References

External links 
 https://universityimages.com/list-of-universities-in-norway/

 
Universities
Norway
Norway